Malaysia national field hockey team may refer to:
 Malaysia men's national field hockey team
 Malaysia women's national field hockey team